Stuart Milton Hodgson, sometimes known as Stu, OC (April 1, 1924 – December 18, 2015) was the commissioner of the Northwest Territories (NWT) from March 2, 1967 until April 6, 1979. The first Commissioner to actually reside in the Northwest Territories, he was a leader in the construction of a semiautonomous, responsible self-government run by residents of the territory. He was appointed as a citizenship judge in British Columbia in December 1997 and served until 2005.
Born in Vancouver, British Columbia, the second son of Allan and Mary Hodgson, Hodgson was one of the founders of the Arctic Winter Games - which began in Yellowknife in 1970 for athletes from Alaska, Yukon, and the NWT – and which now also include Greenland, parts of Arctic Russia, as well as Northern Alberta and Nunavik (Northern Quebec), and the new territory Nunavut which was formed from NWT in 1999. He was appointed as an Officer of the Order of Canada on December 18, 1970 for his service to labour and government. Subsequently he received the Queen's commemorative medals for her silver, golden, and the Queen Elizabeth II Diamond Jubilee Medal (2012); as well as the Canada 125 medal in 1992.

When rapid changes in socio-economic conditions threatened the continuity of Inuit oral history, Commissioner Hodgson urged the taping of elders' stories. In 1974, the residents of Pangnirtung (since then becoming part of Nunavut) presented the Commissioner with eleven stories which were later compiled into a book. Hodgson was nicknamed "Umingmak" by the Inuit.

For his services in the NWT, he was presented the public service's Outstanding Achievement Award in 1976. From 1942-45 he served with the Royal Canadian Navy on convoy duty in the North Atlantic for which he received the 1939–1945 Star, Atlantic Star and other World War II medals. From 1979 to 1981 he was Canadian co-chairman of the U.S.-Canadian International Joint Commission. He was recruited by Premier William R. Bennett of British Columbia to run BC Ferries for a time in the 1980s. He was appointed chairman and chief executive officer of the BC Transit in 1985. Hodgson died on December 18, 2015, aged 91.

Legacy
The Hodgson Trophy was created and awarded beginning in 1978 for fair play and team spirit during the Arctic Winter Games.

References

External links
20th Anniversary Celebration including Commissioner Hodgson
My Little Corner of Canada - "The last colonial czar" by John Amagoalik 
Profile, www.rcmpveteransvancouver.com; accessed February 2, 2019.
Obituary, legacy.com; accessed February 2, 2019.
Stuart M. Hodgson fonds. Northwest Territories Archives

1924 births
2015 deaths
Canadian military personnel from British Columbia
Commissioners of the Northwest Territories
Officers of the Order of Canada
Members of the Legislative Assembly of the Northwest Territories
Politicians from Vancouver
Canadian citizenship judges
Northwest Territories Deputy Commissioners
Royal Canadian Navy personnel of World War II